Daniel Richman Wilson (September 15, 1915 – December 23, 1986) was an American Negro league outfielder in the 1930s and 1940s.

A native of Yazoo City, Mississippi, Wilson was the brother of fellow Negro leaguer Emmett Wilson. Younger brother Dan made his Negro leagues debut in 1936 for the Pittsburgh Crawfords, and was selected to play in the East–West All-Star Game in 1939, 1941 and 1942. He died in St. Louis, Missouri in 1986 at age 71.

References

External links
 and Baseball-Reference Black Baseball stats and Seamheads

1915 births
1986 deaths
Homestead Grays players
St. Louis–New Orleans Stars players
New York Black Yankees players
Harrisburg Stars players
Philadelphia Stars players
Pittsburgh Crawfords players
St. Louis Stars (1939) players
Baseball outfielders
Baseball players from Mississippi
People from Yazoo City, Mississippi
20th-century African-American sportspeople